Eberhard Esche (October 25, 1933 in Leipzig – May 15, 2006 in Berlin) was a German film and television actor. He studied at the Theaterhochschule Leipzig.

He appeared in the following:

For Eyes Only (1961)
Nebel (1963)
Divided Heaven (1964)
The Investigation – Oratorio in 11 Cantos (1966) (TV)
Angeklagter Klehr
Die Perser (1966) (TV)
Traces of Stones (1966)
The Little Prince (1966) (TV)
Geschichten jener Nacht (1967)
Mord am Montag (1968)
Wie heiratet man einen König (1969)
Anlauf (1970) (TV)
KLK Calling PTZ – The Red Orchestra (1971)
Ripe Cherries (1972)
Der Leutnant vom Schwanenkietz (1974) (TV)
Leben mit Uwe (1974)
Till Eulenspiegel (1974)
Beethoven - Tage aus einem Leben (1976)
The Incorrigible Barbara (1977)
Scharnhorst (1978) (mini) TV Series (voice)
Fleur Lafontaine (1978)
Der Spiegel des großen Magus (1980)
Märkische Forschungen (1981)
Sachsens Glanz und Preußens Gloria: Brühl (1985) (TV)
Einzug ins Paradies (1987) (TV)
Sachsens Glanz und Preußens Gloria - Aus dem siebenjährigen Krieg (1987)
 (1995) (TV)
 (1995)
Mama ist unmöglich (1997)
Das Haus der Schwestern (2002) (TV)

Death
He died on 15 May 2006 in Berlin, Germany from pancreatic cancer, aged 72.

External links
 The Guardian, 31 May 2006, Obituary: Eberhard Esche
 

1933 births
2006 deaths
Theaterhochschule Leipzig alumni
Actors from Leipzig
German male film actors
German male television actors
Deaths from pancreatic cancer
Deaths from cancer in Germany